Betar Jerusalem B.C. is an Israeli basketball club that is based in Jerusalem. The club currently plays in the IBBA 3rd league.

In the 1970s the club played five consecutive seasons in the Premier League (1971–1976). The club disbanded in 1976 after finishing last place in the league. The club chairman at the time was Moshe Dadash, who was also chairman of Beitar Jerusalem F.C.

The greatest achievement of the club was participate State Cup final season 1972–73, where they lost to Maccabi Tel Aviv 118:79. The star of the club was Jack Eisner, who scored 2,370 points on 110 games in the Premier League.

In March 2012 announced the coaches Gabi Gefen and Tzur Lavi, and businessman Jacob Cohen that they will lead the establishment of the club again, with the assistance of the Chairman of the former club, Moshe Dadash, and that they are in the process of recruiting players and resources necessary for the operation of the club.

In March 2021 businessman Naum Koen became Chairman Of Honor of The club.

Arena
Currently the club hosts its home games at the community center "Philip Leon" hall in Kiryat HaYovel, when there is a genuine intention to move to Malha Arena and this matter is now in inquiries and require the approval which the club administration hopes to achieve during the current season. Later on and hopefully the club will promote to the Israeli Basketball Super League and be able to qualify the ULEB competitions there is a plan to play at the Jerusalem Arena which is currently being built and should be ready in August 2013.

Honors
Israeli Basketball State Cup
Finalists: 1972–73
IBA Cup (5th League)
Winners: 2012–13

2012/13 Roster

 | dab = basketball |

References

External links
 Club official website

Basketball teams in Israel
Sport in Jerusalem